Adekunle Adesoji is a Paralympian athlete from Nigeria competing mainly in category, T12 sprint events.

He won the gold in the 100 metres EAD, at the 2002 Commonwealth Games and another in the 100 m EAD T12 at the 2006 Commonwealth Games. He set Commonwealth Games records in both his victories. His run of 10.76 seconds at the 2002 Games was a world record for the T12 event.

He won the gold at the 2004 Summer Paralympics in Athens, running a new personal best and world record of 10.75 seconds.

He competed in the 2008 Summer Paralympics in Beijing, China. There he won a silver medal in the men's 100 metres – T12 event and finished fourth in the men's 200 metres – T12 event.

References

External links
 

Year of birth missing (living people)
Living people
Paralympic athletes of Nigeria
Athletes (track and field) at the 2002 Commonwealth Games
Athletes (track and field) at the 2006 Commonwealth Games
Athletes (track and field) at the 2008 Summer Paralympics
Commonwealth Games gold medallists for Nigeria
Paralympic silver medalists for Nigeria
Nigerian male sprinters
Visually impaired sprinters
Yoruba sportspeople
Paralympic gold medalists for Nigeria
Commonwealth Games medallists in athletics
Medalists at the 2004 Summer Paralympics
Medalists at the 2008 Summer Paralympics
Paralympic medalists in athletics (track and field)
20th-century Nigerian people
21st-century Nigerian people
Medallists at the 2002 Commonwealth Games
Medallists at the 2006 Commonwealth Games